Lucy Taylor is an American horror novel writer.  Her novel, The Safety of Unknown Cities was awarded the Bram Stoker Award for Best First Novel and the International Horror Guild Award for Best First Novel in 1995, and the Deathrealm Award for Best Novel in 1996. Her collection The Flesh Artist was nominated for the Bram Stoker Award (Superior Achievement in a Fiction Collection) in 1994.

Taylor's horror fictions do not usually feature supernatural elements, instead being psychological thrillers about extreme human relationships. Taylor has been called "The Queen of Erotic Horror" by Jasmine Sailing. The online Locus Index to Science Fiction (published by Locus Magazine) has also categorized several of her works as "erotic horror". Original short fiction of hers appears in all five volumes of the international anthology series, Exotic Gothic.

She has a B.A. in philosophy. Her early writing included non-fiction travel writing.

Reception
Reviewing Taylor's book A Respite for the Dead, Peter Tennant called it "a compelling and totally engaging story, one in which the strangeness is woven deep into every line of the text." Jess Nevins stated that Taylor "is skilled at portraying dysfunctional human relationships and the price they demand from the innocent and the weak."

Partial bibliography
See the ISFDB listing in external links for a more complete bibliography, including works of short fiction.

Novels

 The Safety of Unknown Cities (Dark Side Press, 1995; The Mammoth Book of Erotica; Overlook Connection Press, 1999) 
 Sub-Human (1998)
 Eternal Hearts (1999)
 Saving Souls (Onyx, 2002) 
 Dancing With Demons (Necro Press, Ebook 2019)

Collections

 The Flesh Artist (1993)
 Close to the Bone (1993)
 Painted in Blood (1996)
 The Silence Between the Screams (2004)
 Fatal Journeys (2014)
 Spree and Other Stories (2018)

Omnibus

 Sideshow Double #1: Sub-Human/The Colour out of Darkness (1998)  with John Pelan

Chapbooks
 Flame Thrower / Blood Rights (1991) with Ann K. Schwader
 Spree (1998)
 A Respite for the Dead (2014)

Anthologies

 Triptych (1999) with Edward Lee and John Pelan
 "The Butsudan," Exotic Gothic, Ash-Tree Press, 2007, ed. Danel Olson
 "Tívar," Exotic Gothic 2, Ash-Tree Press, 2008, ed. Danel Olson
 "Sanguma," Exotic Gothic 3, Ash-Tree Press, 2009, ed. Danel Olson
 "Nikishi," Exotic Gothic 4, PS Publishing, May 2012, ed. Danel Olson
 "Djinn's Blood," Exotic Gothic 5, PS Publishing, June 2013, ed. Danel Olson

Notes

External links
 
 

1950 births
Living people
20th-century American novelists
20th-century American short story writers
21st-century American novelists
21st-century American short story writers
American horror writers
American women novelists
American women short story writers
20th-century American women writers
21st-century American women writers